Saint Sabbas of Storozhi ( - Savva Storozhevsky) - an Orthodox monk and saint of 14-15th century. He was the founder and first hegumen of the monastery of the Nativity of the Theotokos in Zvenigorod on Storozhi hill, which was later given the name of saint (Savvino-Storozhevsky Monastery).

Sabbas was one of the first disciples of Sergius of Radonezh and spent almost the whole of his life in Trinity-St. Sergius Lavra.

The saint was very popular for his alleged healings, sagacity and preaching. He died in 1407 and canonized in 1547.

Commemorated on August 23 and December 19.

References

Russian saints of the Eastern Orthodox Church
1407 deaths
15th-century Christian saints
Year of birth unknown